Varkund is a village in the Daman district in the Indian Union Territory of Dadra and Nagar Haveli and Daman and Diu.

References

Villages in Daman district, India